Regina Liguid Alatiit (born June 28, 1959), professionally known as Gina Alajar, is a FAMAS and Gaward Urian Award winning Filipino film and television actress and television director.

Career

Since appearing as a child actress in the early 1970s, Alajar has been a critically acclaimed actress. She has appeared in films such as Playgirl, Bayan Ko, Brutal, Salome, Mulanay, and has collaborated with directors such as Lino Brocka, Ishmael Bernal, Maryo J. de los Reyes, Chito S. Roño, Gil Portes, Marilou Diaz-Abaya, her directorial work has been enhanced in the 2000s in television work for GMA Network dramas.

From 1997–2009, she was seen mostly in television soap operas on GMA and in 2009–2010, she was seen in ABS-CBN dramas such as Kambal Sa Uma and 2010's Habang May Buhay. In 2012, she received more massive acclaim for the TV series Hiram na Puso, a comeback feat in her TV career on GMA Network.

In 2016, she came back to television in the fantasy afternoon drama Magkaibang Mundo as a main antagonist. In 2018, she starred in the daytime drama Hindi Ko Kayang Iwan Ka as an antagonist-protagonist role of Adelaida "Adel" Angeles.

Personal life
Alajar was part of Dulaang UP. She has three sons with Michael de Mesa, from whom she is separated: Ryan, Geoff and A.J. Eigenmann.

Filmography

Film
Kaibigan Kong Sto. Niño (1967) .... Oreng
Donata (1968) .... Donata
Pinagbuklod ng Langit (1969) - as Irene Marcos
Si Darna at ang Planetman (1969) .... Narda
Mga Anghel Na Walang Langit (1970)
Wanted: Perfect Mother (1970)
Mag-inang Ulila (1971)
My Little Brown Girl (1972)
Zoom, Zoom, Superman! (1973)
Cofradia (1973)
Big J (1975)
Mahiwagang Kris (1977)
Malayo Man, Malapit Din (1977)
Boy Pana (Terror ng Maynila '63) (1978)
Diborsyada (1979) - Gina
Anak ng Maton (1979)
City After Dark (1980)
Brutal (1980) - Cynthia
Caught in the Act (1981) - Rowena
Salome (1981) - Salome
Playgirl (1981)
Ako ang Hari (1981)
High School Scandal (1981)
Wild (1981)
Brother Ben (1982) - Lina
Moral (1982)
Caged Fury (1983) - Nguyet
Ganti (1983)
Bukas... May Pangarap (1984) - Mering
Pieta, Ikalawang Aklat (1984)
Kaya Kong Abuting ang Langit (1984) - Nancy
Sister Stella L. (1984)
Condemned (1984) - Mayette
Bulaklak ng City Jail (1984) - Juliet
Bayan ko: My Own Country (1985) - Luz
Ano ang Kulay ng Mukha ng Diyos? (1985)
Hindi Mo Ako Kayang Tapakan (1986) .... Josephine
Tatlong Ina, Isang Anak (1987) - Belle
Hiwaga sa Balete Drive (1988)
Birds of Prey (1988)
Babaing Hampaslupa (1988) - Desiree
Fight for Us (1989) - Esper
Andrea, Paano Ba ang Maging Isang Ina? (1990) - Joyce
Kailan Ka Magiging Akin? (1991) - Shirley
Emma Salazar Case (1991)
Biktima (1991)
Shake, Rattle & Roll III (1991) - Rowena (segment "Ate")
Lucia (1992)
Shake, Rattle & Roll IV (1992) - Puri (segment "Ang Madre") 
The Wild Cowboys (1992) - Regina Smith
Teenage Mama (1993)
Victim No. 1: Delia Maga (Jesus, Pray For Us!) – A Massacre in Singapore (1995) - Delia Maga
Campus Girls (1995)
Ipaglaban Mo: The Movie (1996)
Dead or Alive: Arrest the King of Carnappers (1996)
Mulanay: Sa Pusod ng Paraiso (1996)
Frats (1997) - Oning
Tatlo... Magkasalo (1998)
Mother Ignacia – Ang Uliran (1998) - Mother Ignacia (younger years)
José Rizal (1998) - Saturnina Rizal
Sa Piling ng Mga Aswang (1999) - Lola Munda
The Debut (2000) - Gina Mercado
Bahay ni Lola (2001)
Small Voices (2002) - Chayong
Singsing ni Lola (2002) - Esper
Ang Agimat, Anting-anting ni Lolo (2002) - Clarita
Mano Po (2002) Gina Go
Sanib (2003)
Pinoy/Blonde (2005)
Lovestruck (2005)
Mainit Na Tubig (2006)
Batad sa Paang Palay (2006)
Mano Po 5: Gua Ai Di (I Love You) (2006)
Fuchsia (2009) Nena
Guni-Guni (2012) Mrs. Arevalo
Mater Dolorosa (2012)
The Reunion (2012) Joanne
Dark Is the Night (2017)
Pastor (2017) Mildred Aguila
Last Fool Show (2019) Joanna Lee
PIETA (2023) Beth

Television

As a TV director

 
Films:
2007: Angels (Angel's of Mine - GMA Films
2007: Shake Rattle and Roll 9:Christmas Tree 
2009: Shake Rattle and Roll 11: Diablo 
1992: Shake Rattle and Roll 4: Madre
1991: Shake Rattle and Roll 3: Ate

References

External links

1959 births
Living people
20th-century Filipino actresses
21st-century Filipino actresses
Filipino Christians
Filipino evangelicals
Filipino film actresses
Filipino people of Chinese descent
Filipino television actresses
Filipino television directors
GMA Network (company) people
GMA Network personalities
Participants in Philippine reality television series
People from Tondo, Manila
Tagalog people
Women television directors